Oakford is an outer suburb of Perth, Western Australia, within the Shire of Serpentine-Jarrahdale. The suburb was named in 1982, taking its name from a townsite briefly declared in the area in 1926.

School
Oakford doesn't have any schools but a close primary school is West Byford Primary School, Woodland Primary School, Beenyup Primary School, Carey Baptist College Forrestdale, Hammond Park Secondary College

References

External links

Suburbs of Perth, Western Australia
Shire of Serpentine-Jarrahdale